Gabriel Álvarez Saborio (born May 3, 1969) is a Costa Rican slalom canoer.

Career
Álavarez competed in the early 1990s. He finished 43rd in the K-1 event at the 1992 Summer Olympics in Barcelona.

References

1969 births
Canoeists at the 1992 Summer Olympics
Costa Rican male canoeists
Living people
Olympic canoeists of Costa Rica